Karl Lennart Hjalmar Nylander (4 September 1901 – 15 July 1966) was a Swedish diplomat.

Career
Nylander was born in Edefors, Sweden, the son of Emil Nyland, a physician, and his wife Hedvig von Post. He passed studentexamen in Växjö in 1920 and received a Candidate of Law degree from Uppsala University in 1925 and a bachelor's degree in 1928. Nylander was Head Marshal (Övermarskalk) at the university's 450th anniversary in 1927. Nylander became an attaché at the Ministry for Foreign Affairs in Stockholm in 1928 and served at the Swedish Consulate General in New York City the same year. Nylander then served as an attaché in Berne in 1930 and as second secretary at the Foreign Ministry in Stockholm in 1933.

Nyland was a first legation secretary in Riga, Tallinn and Kovno from 1936 to 1938. Nylander became first secretary at the Foreign Ministry in Stockholm in 1938 and legation secretary in Moscow in 1940 and Director at the Foreign Ministry in Stockholm in 1942. In 1942, Nylander was posted in Berlin as trade counsellor, and in 1944 he was appointed legation secretary there. In 1945, Nylander was appointed consul general in New York City. He served 10 years as consul general before being appointed envoy at the Swedish Embassy in Mexico City in 1955. Nylander served as ambassador there from 1956 to 1962, also as non-resident ambassador to Guatemala, Costa Rica, Honduras, Nicaragua and El Salvador.

Nylander was a board member of the Chesapeake Corp of Virginia, of the Swedish Seamen's Welfare Fund, Inc. (chairman from 1947), and the Seamen of Sweden, Inc. (chairman from 1949) in New York City. He was also an honorary member of the American Swedish Historical Foundation. Nylander was an honorary doctor of the Bard College in New York and Upsala College in New Jersey.

Personal life
Nylander was first married from 1929 to 1952 with Margareta Fjellander (1904–1979), the daughter of Gunnar Fjellander and Elisabeth Svedberg. In 1952 he married Inga Olsson, the daughter of Elis Olsson. He was the father of Carl (born 1932), Anne Marie (born 1933), Mary Anne (born 1933), and Elisabeth (1933–2011).

Awards and decorations
Nylanders awards:

Commander First Class of the Order of the Polar Star
Commander with Star of the Order of St. Olav
Commander of the Order of the Three Stars
Commander of the Order of the Lithuanian Grand Duke Gediminas
Commander of the Order of Orange-Nassau
Commander of the Order of the German Eagle
Officer of the Order of Leopold II
Knight First Class of the Order of the White Rose of Finland
Fourth Class of the Order of the Cross of the Eagle

References

1901 births
1966 deaths
Consuls-general of Sweden
Ambassadors of Sweden to Mexico
Ambassadors of Sweden to Guatemala
Ambassadors of Sweden to Costa Rica
Ambassadors of Sweden to Honduras
Ambassadors of Sweden to Nicaragua
Ambassadors of Sweden to El Salvador
People from Boden Municipality
Uppsala University alumni
Commanders First Class of the Order of the Polar Star
20th-century Swedish people